David Burke (born 7 January 1990) is an Irish hurler who plays as a midfielder or half forward for the Galway senior team.

Burke joined the team in 2010 and immediately became a regular member of the starting fifteen. He has won one Leinster winners' medal and two National Hurling League winners' medal.

At club level Burke plays with St Thomas's.

Burke is a woodwork teacher by profession. 

Burke is fond of a battered sausage every now and again

Playing career

Club

Burke plays his club hurling with St Thomas's. His honours include a County Minor A Championship from 2008 and also a County U-21 A Championship from 2011. Burke was captain of the St Thomas's team on both occasions. David Burke also won a County Senior championship in 2012 and an All-Ireland Club championship in 2013. He won another county total in 2016 but lost to Ballyaodh in the All Ireland club semi-finals. In 2018 he won another county total beating Liam Mellows. He went on to the All-Ireland club final only to lose to Ballyhale Shamrocks of Kilkenny. He once again went on to beat Liam Mellows in the 2019 County Hurling final.

Inter-county

Burke first came to prominence on the inter-county scene as a member of the Galway minor hurling team. In 2008 he lined out in the All-Ireland final; however, Kilkenny accounted for the westerners.

Two years later Burke had joined the Galway under-21 team and lined out in that year's championship decider.

Burke made his senior debut in championship against Wexford.

In 2011, Burke was a member of the victorious Galway All-Ireland Under 21 Championship winning team.

In 2012, Burke was a member of the Galway team which won the Leinster Senior Hurling Championship for an historic first time. He played at right half forward on the Galway team which defeated Kilkenny on a scoreline of 2-21 to 2-11. Galway were defeated in the final by Kilkenny after a replay. In October 2012, as recognition for his season for the county, Burke received his first All Star Award.

In 2015, Burke was a key player at midfield in Galway's run to the All-Ireland Final, where they were defeated by Kilkenny. His form in the championship earned him his second All-Star Award in November 2015. At the beginning of the 2016 season, Burke became captain of the Galway senior hurling team. In November 2016, Burke received his third All-Star award.

On 22 April 2017, Burke captained Galway to win the 2017 National Hurling League after a 3-21 to 0-14 win against Tipperary in the final.

On 3 September 2017, he captained Galway to their first All-Ireland Senior Hurling Championship win for 29 years.

At 32 years of age, Burke became his county's appearance record holder (63) against Cork in the 2022 All-Ireland Senior Hurling Championship quarter-final on 18 June 2022.

Career statistics

Honours

Club
 Galway Senior Hurling Championship (6): 2012, 2016, 2018, 2019, 2020, 2021
 All-Ireland Senior Club Hurling Championship (1): 2012-13

College
 Fitzgibbon Cup (1): 2011

County
 Walsh Cup (1): 2010
 National Hurling League (3): 2010, 2017 (c), 2021
 Leinster Senior Hurling Championship (3): 2012,  2017 (c), 2018 (c)
 All-Ireland Under-21 Hurling Championship (1): 2011
 All-Ireland Senior Hurling Championship (1): 2017 (c)

Awards
 All-Stars (4): 2012, 2015, 2016, 2017
The Sunday Game Team of the Year (3): 2015, 2016, 2017
 All-Ireland Senior Hurling Championship Final Man of the Match (1): 2017

References

1990 births
Living people
Galway inter-county hurlers
Irish schoolteachers
St Thomas's hurlers